Brunonia Barry (1950 in Salem, Massachusetts) is the author of The Lace Reader and The Map of True Places.  Her third novel, The Fifth Petal: a novel, was published on January 24, 2017.  Barry, with husband Gary Ward, founded SmartGames, a game and puzzle software company.

Biography 
Born in Salem, Massachusetts in 1950, Sandra Brunonia Barry grew up in neighboring Marblehead She went to Green Mountain College in Vermont and to the University of New Hampshire. After a few years of trying to live on option money as a screenwriter, she turned to computers, working for several years in the sales and marketing division of Lotus Development Corp. In 2006, after writing it for six years, she and Ward self-published The Lace Reader, which utilized Ipswich lace as a plot device. Eventually the rights were sold to William Morrow for over 2 million dollars. Her second book, The Map of True Places, was published in 2010. She currently lives in Salem, Massachusetts.

In 2017 she worked with the North Shore YMCA to co-write a play about opioid use in the region.

Selected bibliography 
 The Lace Reader, William Morrow, 2006
 The Map of True Places, William Morrow, 2010
 The Fifth Petal, Crown, 2017

Awards 
 The International Women's Fiction Festival's Baccante Award
 Ragdale Artists' Colony's Strnad Fellowship
 New England Book Festival's award for Best Fiction
 Amazon's Best of the Month

External links 
 Author's webpage

References 

Living people
1950 births
American women novelists
21st-century American women writers
Green Mountain College alumni
University of New Hampshire alumni
People from Salem, Massachusetts
Novelists from Massachusetts
American fantasy writers
Women science fiction and fantasy writers
21st-century American novelists